Fictive may refer to:

 Fictive kinship
 Fictive marriage, a term for Marriage of convenience
 Fictive motion, a relatively new subject in psycholinguistics and cognitive linguistics
 Fictive architecture, a term for Trompe-l'œil
 Fictive behavior